Edward Murphy (born January 14, 1956) is a retired American professional basketball player. He was a 6'4" shooting guard-small forward. Born in Bayonne, New Jersey, he played basketball at Marist High School. He opted in 1974 for the academic team of Merrimack College, where he stayed until 1978, twice finishing as NCAA II runner-up (1977, 1978). Top scorer of the Merrimack team, Murphy was drafted in 1978 by the Atlanta Hawks, in the 8th round (160th pick overall). He never played in the NBA, instead landing in Europe. He first played the Netherlands in the B.O.B. Rotterdam (1978–79) and then in Belgium with RC Mechelen (1979 to 1981) with which he led the team to the Belgian title.

In 1981, he joined the CSP Limoges. Between 1981 and 1985, Murphy won three French championships (1983, 1984, 1985), three times the Federation Cup (1982, 1983, 1985) and two Korać cups (1982, 1983). In 1985, he moved to Switzerland and played for Champel Geneva (1985 to 1988) with whom he won the Swiss Cup twice (1986 and 1987). Ed Murphy ended his basketball career in a last Swiss club, the BBC Nyon (1988 to 1990).

Biography

His debut in the United States

Edward Murphy, more commonly known as Ed Murphy, begins young to play basketball. In grammar school, Ed Murphy, aged 10 marked 68 points. Later, he joined in New Jersey, School Marist High School. He quickly proven by spending hours adjusting his shots to work his technique. During his last season in the Marist High School (1973-1974), the young prodigy was prolific with an average of 33 points. He succeeded, eventually, to integrate, at the dawn of the 1974–1975 season, the American academic team, Merrimack College, while playing in the NCAA II. From 1974 to 1978, it operates under the blue and yellow tunic Merrimack College. With his college team, he managed a few splinters. Renowned for its long-distance shooting, he registered 48 points including in an NCAA II's game. Ed Murphy becomes over university seasons, the leading scorer in Merrimack, reaching from 1976, an average of points per game, more than the 30 points. His address won him several titles, collective and individual. Twice Ed Murphy was vice-champion of the NCAA II (1977, 1978) with its university club losing systematically against the « Sacred Heart University ». Alongside the performance of his team, Ed Murphy is nominated once in the second team All-American NCAA II of the 1975–1976 season and twice the first team All-American NCAA II during the 1976–1977 season and 1977-1978 . In addition, during the 1976–1977 season, his talent facing the basket, allows him to finish as top scorer II NCAA championship.

Logically, Edward Murphy drafted in 1978 by the Atlanta Hawks (NBA) in the 8th round in 160th position. However, from a small college, officials Hawks offered him only to sign a contract for "Free Agent". Without warranty of the Atlanta Hawks, Ed Murphy offers repels Hawks. Ed Murphy would not wait and explains to Maxi-Basket, in September 1982, the transition: « It is too hard to hold on. So in the fall of 78, I decided to find a job. I worked two months in United Parcel Service (local PTT) and in November a call from Glinder Torain, which places American players in Europe, decided to come to me to try my luck in the Netherlands ».

First steps in Europe (1978-1981)

It was during the 1978–1979 season, just 23 years, Ed Murphy discovers the European basketball in the Netherlands. He signed club BOB Oud-Beijerland (Netherlands Division 1, November 1978), in November 1978. His arrival in the Netherlands is the result of advice Glinder Torain but also advised along the scouting and player-coach of BOB Oud-Beijerland, Charis Sideris. Ed Murphy for the US B.O.B. Rotterdam, Wayne Golden, however his role in his new team remains unchanged, the scorer. In this exercise, the Netherlands, he excels and turns throughout the season to 36 points per match. For his first match on 25 November 1978 Ed Murphy made a sensational debut against the champion of the Netherlands, Den Bosch, scoring 41 points in the game despite the defeat of his team (90-109), a performance of choice Den Bosch against the best defenders (Lister, Cramer or Kirkland) it provokes the ire of coach-star of Den Bosch, Ton Boot. Against Radio Muzette (Radio Muzette Rotterdam-Zuid), Ed Murphy makes an outstanding game with 49 points in the encounter. It helps fight high ranks teams like Nationale Nederlanden Donar of Groningen or the Parker Leiden. Ed Murphy has earned a reputation quickly in the Dutch Championship. A stature that allows him to be selected to the All-Star Game of the Netherlands (25 March 1979). He ended the All-Star Gala meeting with 30 points and won with the selection of the match against North selecting South (114-107). Ed Murphy branded spirits like BOB tells the player-coach Rotterdam, Charis Sideris in the wafer of 50 years of BOB Rotterdam Oud-Beijerland: « I remember how Wim Benschop and I had followed his successful campaign, we watched him play with an excited look and a smile, the class. ». With 35.8 points per contest, Murphy was the leading scorer of the Dutch league in 1978–79, however with BOB Rotterdam (fifth place with 15 wins and 21 defeats) he missed the playoff matches for the national title.

After this season the Netherlands, Ed Murphy an international reputation and takes charge of another championship Benelux, Belgium. He chose the RC Mechelen (Division 1, Belgium) which had long marked the native of Bayonne. RC Mechelen intends to do better than last season (11th place in the 1978–1979 season) and is the first places. In his first season (1979-1980), he won the title of Champion of Belgium with RC Mechelen and finished top scorer of the Belgian Championship with 30.5 points average. At the same time, the RC Mechelen qualified for the 1980-1981 edition of the European Cup of Clubs Champions. The following season, Ed Murphy, with his experience, intends to retain the national title and do well in the European Cup of Clubs Champions. Racing Mechelen and Ed Murphy fails hen the final of the European Cup of Clubs Champions quarterfinals, finishing in second place in Pool F (3 wins and 3 losses) behind CSKA Moscow (6 wins and 0 ) qualified for the quarterfinals. Meanwhile, in the Belgian Championship, Ed Murphy is injured before the final against BC Oostende. The RC Mechelen logically suffered another setback in the final against BC Oostende. Edward Murphy was however regular face the basket and registered throughout the 1980–1981 season, 29.8 points on average. In total, Ed Murphy, in two seasons, became the record holder Belgium Basketball Championship in 1108 with registered points. From this experience in Belgium, Ed Murphy recalls: « I had good friends in Belgium and the team worked fine. We won the title by 80 and lost in the finals the following year. ».

Ed Murphy and the Limoges CSP (1981-1985)
Murphy joined Limoges CSP in 1981. Limoges coach André Buffière had insisted on signing him and Murphy quickly silenced his critics who said that he was unathletic and too slow. A pure shooter, Murphy would turn out to be one of the best players in the history of the French league. "I never played in a more exciting place. (...) I never played in front of a public that vocal, loud", he remembered the home games at Limoges almost 30 years after playing for the team. He led the league in scoring four straight years (1982 - 1985) and was named best import player in 1983, 84 and 85. Murphy helped Limoges win three French national championship titles (1983, 84, 85), three Coupe de la Fédération titles (1982, 83, 85) and two Korac Cup titles (1982, 83). In his first year at CSP (1981–82), Murphy scored 29.3 points a contest and increased his average each year: 1982-83: 31.6ppg, 1983-84: 32.3ppg, 1984-85: 34.1ppg.

Reflecting on how his Limoges stint ended at the conclusion of the 1984–85 season, Murphy said years later: "We had like a verbal agreement of a two-year contract, for Limoges for two more years. But I couldn’t play, my achilles… I never missed a game in four years. I was in pain and I was getting treatment, I havn’t been practising or anything. And they said I had to go and I didn’t play in a game. And then Xavier Popelier (Limoges CSP chairman at the time) came in and told me I was no more on the team. So that is how my career ended in Limoges. (...) Back then, if you were an American, they would just change the American."

In September 2016, almost 30 years after having played for the club, he had his jersey number 8 retired by Limoges CSP. He was also named best foreign player of the French league in the 20th century.

The last feats of arms in Switzerland (1985-1990)
Murphy continued his playing career with Champel de Genève of Switzerland after having parted company with Limoges in 1985. Looking back on how he came to Switzerland, Murphy said later: "I was supposed to go to Naples. And it didn’t work out and I had no job. I was home with no job. And I went up going to Geneva. They had an international school, I loved it there. I just didn’t have a job and they were the first ones to offer me a job and then they offered me a good contract to stay and I stayed." In the 1985–86 season, Murphy averaged 40.1 points per game in the Swiss league. He only played two games for the team in the 1986-87 campaign. In 1987–88, he scored 39.9 points a contest for Geneva, with a season-high 54 points, four games with 50 points or more and 15 further games with 40-plus points. He stayed in Geneva until 1988 and then moved to BBC Nyon, where he spent the last years of his playing career.

References

Further reading

External links
 Ed Murphy Profile from the website encyclocsp.fr
 Biographical Portrait of Ed Murphy on the blog top50csplimoges.overblog.com
 Biographical Portrait of Ed Murphy from the website basketretro.com
 Statistics of Ed Murphy with Limoges CSP from the website basketarchives.fr
 Reportage about Ed Murphy from the website lequipemagazine.fr
 Non official Ed Murphy's page on facebook.com
 Ed Murphy final Cup of the Federation sur youtube.com
 Pantheon of the greatest players of the CSP from the website beaublanc.com
 Article about the CSP Limoges's victory in the Korac final 1982 from the website de Basketactu.com
 Article about the CSP Limoges's History between 1982 and 1989 from the website france3-regions.francetvinfo.fr

1956 births
Living people
American expatriate basketball people in Belgium
American expatriate basketball people in France
American expatriate basketball people in Switzerland
American men's basketball players
Atlanta Hawks draft picks
Basketball players from New Jersey
Limoges CSP players
Merrimack Warriors men's basketball players
Shooting guards
Small forwards
Sportspeople from Bayonne, New Jersey
Sportspeople from Hudson County, New Jersey